Hampstead is an on-island suburb of Montreal, Quebec, Canada. It is an independent municipality, surrounded by the boroughs of Montreal.

History

The Town of Hampstead was founded in 1914. It was designed to be an exclusive garden city.  There are no retail shops within municipal boundaries.  Houses were assigned relatively large lots to allow space for trees and shrubbery. The town's roads were designed with curves in order to slow down traffic and to create an interesting and intimate landscape. Despite its rather flat topography—much of the territory was once a golf course—the town was named after another garden city, the London suburb of Hampstead Village.  Like its namesake, Hampstead is the home of many affluent citizens, and competes with a few other suburbs for first place in the rankings of highest average household incomes in Canada.

Merger and demerger
On January 1, 2002, as part of the 2002–06 municipal reorganization of Montreal, it was merged with Côte-Saint-Luc and Montreal West and became the Côte-Saint-Luc–Hampstead–Montréal-Ouest borough of the City of Montreal.  However, after a change of government and a 2004 referendum, all three were re-constituted as independent cities on January 1, 2006.

Demographics 

In terms of mother tongue, the 2006 census found that, including multiple responses, almost 63% of residents spoke English, and about 16% of residents spoke French. The next most commonly reported first languages learned were Hebrew, Yiddish, Polish and Romanian. 

The town is noted for having the highest percentage of Jewish residents of any city in Canada, and the third highest worldwide outside Israel.

Local government
In the November 6, 2005 municipal elections, William (Bill) Steinberg was elected mayor of Hampstead. Steinberg was the first new mayor after 4 years of civic control by Gérald Tremblay, when Hampstead was part of Montreal. Mayor Steinberg defeated Irving Adessky who had been mayor for 27 years (1974-2001) and former councillor Gerald Kestner. In his honour, the community centre has been renamed after him. Steinberg was re-elected on November 1, 2009 defeating former town councillor David Sternthal with 61% of the vote. On November 3, 2013 Mayor Steinberg was re-elected for a third term defeating former town councillor Bonnie Feigenbaum with 61.21% of the vote (voter turnout was 44.5%). In the 2017 Municipal Elections, Steinberg, Warren Budning, Harvey Shaffer, Jack Edery, and Michael Goldwax were acclaimed. Bill Steinberg served as Mayor for 16 years (2005-2021).

Current Government:
 Mayor: Jeremy Levi
 Councillors: 
Leon Elfasy
Jack Edery
Harvey Shaffer
Michael Goldwax
Warren Budning
Jason Farber

Former mayors
List of former mayors:
 James Baillie (1914–1924)
 James A. Baillie (1924–1928, 1930–1932)
 William Schuyler Lighthall (1928–1930)
 Archibald F. Byers (1932–1935)
 Vincent E. Scully (1935–1936)
 Hartland Glaspell Parsons (1936–1948)
 Lyman Ira Playfair (1948–1964)
 Stuart Milnet Finlayson (1964–1974)
 Irving L. Adessky (1974–2001)
 William Steinberg (2005–2021)
 Jeremy Levi (2021–present)

Transportation
Two major thoroughfares exist in Hampstead. One is Queen Mary Road and the other is Fleet Road. While it is difficult to drive quickly down Queen Mary (because of all the stop signs), Fleet Road is geared for automobile traffic, with synchronized traffic lights.

Hampstead is accessible by the following STM bus lines: 51 Édouard-Montpetit (Queen-Mary), 66 The Boulevard (Côte-Saint-Luc), 161 Van Horne (Fleet), 166 Queen Mary (Macdonald).

There were various stages of development for Hampstead. The newer areas tend to be to the north and to the west. The city is almost completely composed of single family residences, except for the apartment buildings on Côte-Saint-Luc Road, and the duplexes and triplexes along MacDonald, Cleve, Dufferin, Heath, Holtham, Harrow and Aldred Roads. There are no commercial properties in the city. There is only one school in the city, the Hampstead Elementary School, which is public.

At the beginning of each summer is Hampstead Day, which features a small carnival and fireworks, curated by the staff of the Hampstead Pool and of the Hampstead Day Camp.

International relations

Twin towns — Sister cities
Hampstead is twinned with:
 Kiryat Shmona, Israel (since 1978)

See also
 People from the Town of Hampstead

References

External links

 
Cities and towns in Quebec
Island of Montreal municipalities
Jewish communities in Canada
Jews and Judaism in Montreal
Bilingual cities and towns in Quebec